"Hats Off to the Bull" is the second single from Chevelle's sixth studio album, Hats Off to the Bull. The song also appears on the band's greatest hits album, Stray Arrows: A Collection of Favorites.

It is an anti-animal cruelty song.

Critical reception
Loudwire ranked it the seventh greatest Chevelle song. AOL Radio called it the ninth best rock song of 2011.

Music video
A music video was released for the song via the band's Vevo and YouTube accounts on April 18, 2012 and was directed by P.R. Brown, who also directed the video for previous single "Face to the Floor".

The video begins with the band members waking up on the street, bloodied and bruised, before they are attacked by an unseen force. The unseen force is revealed to be a kid, playing with toy figures of the band, much like a voodoo doll. The video ends with the kid stepping on the toys, killing the band members and zooms in to reveal he is holding a toy figurine of a bull.

Charts

Weekly charts

Year-end charts

References

External links
 Official music video on YouTube

2012 singles
Chevelle (band) songs
Epic Records singles
Songs about animal rights
Songs written by Pete Loeffler
Songs written by Sam Loeffler
Songs written by Dean Bernardini